Croydon Central Library is Croydon's main public library located inside the Croydon Clocktower in Croydon, south London. It is owned by the London Borough of Croydon on behalf of Croydon Council. The library is located on four floors inside the building. There are also children's reading sessions.

It was the third-most-used public library in the UK in 2010.

References

External links
Croydon Central Library Webpage

Public libraries in London
Libraries in the London Borough of Croydon